Otto Eduard Hasse (11 July 1903 – 12 September 1978) was a German film actor and director.

Biography 
Hasse was born to Wilhelm Gustav Eduard Hasse, a blacksmith, and Valeria Hasse in the village of Obersitzko, Province of Posen, German Empire and gained his first stage experiences in high school at Kolmar, together with his classmate Berta Drews. Hasse began to study law at the University of Berlin but abandoned this study after three semesters and changed over to Max Reinhardt's acting school at the Deutsches Theater in Berlin, to receive an actor's education.

He first appeared at theatres in Thale, Breslau, and from 1930 till 1939 at the Kammerspiele in Munich, where he also worked as a stage director for the first time. In 1939, he moved to the German Theatre in Prague and shortened his name to O.E. instead of Otto Eduard.

In 1944, he was conscripted to the Luftwaffe and slightly wounded. After World War II Hasse became a famous German film actor, also internationally appearing in the Alfred Hitchcock film I Confess (1953) with Montgomery Clift and Anne Baxter, and starring with Clark Gable and Lana Turner in Betrayed (1954).

In 1959, he was a member of the jury at the 9th Berlin International Film Festival.

Hasse was the German dubbing voice of Charles Laughton, Humphrey Bogart, Spencer Tracy and Clark Gable. Hasse died in Berlin and is buried at the Waldfriedhof Dahlem.

Since 1981, the Academy of Arts, Berlin, has awarded an O.E. Hasse Prize to benefit young actors.

Filmography

 The Last Laugh (1924) as Small Role (uncredited)
 Peter Voss, Thief of Millions (1932) as 2. Realtor
 Cruiser Emden (1932) as English Officer
 Must We Get Divorced? (1933) as A hairdresser
 Fräulein Hoffmans Erzählungen (1933)
 The Switched Bride (1934)
 Little Dorrit (1934)
 Peer Gynt (1934) as helmsman
 Knockout (1935)
 Ein ganzer Kerl (1935) as Manfred Bolle, Son
 The King's Prisoner (1935) as Von Zilchow
 The Unsuspecting Angel (1936) as Kornitzki
 Der schüchterne Casanova (1936) as Schnellhase, chief advertiser
 Die große und die kleine Welt (1936) 
 Dinner Is Served (1936) as Francis, chauffeur
 So weit geht die Liebe nicht (1937) as hairdresser Hübner
 Three Wonderful Days (1939)
 Stukas (1941) as Senior doctor Dr. Gregorius
 Everything for Gloria (1941) as Dr. Heinz
  (1941) as Peter Wallbrecht
 Rembrandt (1942)
 Die Entlassung (1942) as Baron von Heyden
 Doctor Crippen (1942) as Prof. Morrison
 Gefährtin meines Sommers (1943) as Gerhard Morton, Angelika's betrothed
 The Eternal Tone (1943) as Impresario Grundmann
 Beloved Darling (1943) as Lawyer
 Der große Preis (1944) as inspector Wegener
 Der Täter ist unter uns (1944) as Dr. Kauper
 Come Back to Me (1944) 
 Aufruhr der Herzen (1944) as Thomas Volderauer
 Philharmoniker (1944) as Urdol, concert agent
 The Berliner (1948) as the reactionary
 Anonymous Letters (1949) as Alexander Petershagen
 The Big Lift (1950) as Stieber
 The Orplid Mystery (1950) as editor in chief Dr. Mannheim
 Decision Before Dawn (1951) as Col. Oberst von Ecker
 The Sergeant's Daughter (1952) as cavalry captain Graf Ledenburg
 I Confess (1953) as Otto Keller
 The Last Waltz (1953) as Prince Paul
 When The Village Music Plays on Sunday Nights (1953) as Bruckner
 Lachkabinett (1953)
 Betrayed (1954) as Col. Helmuth Dietrich
 Canaris (1954) as Adm. Canaris
 Above Us the Waves (1955) as Captain of the Tirpitz
  (1955) as Colonel von Plönnies
  (1955) as General von Plönnies
 Alibi (1955) as Peter Hansen
 Kitty and the Great Big World (1956) as Sir William Ashlin
 The Adventures of Arsène Lupin (1957) as emperor Wilhelm II
 No Sun in Venice (1957) as Eric von Bergen
 The Last Ones Shall Be First (1957) as Ludwig Darrandt
 The Spies (1957) as Hugo Vogel
 The Glass Tower (1957) as Robert Fleming
 The Doctor of Stalingrad (1958) as Dr. Fritz Böhler, Staff surgeon
 The Muzzle (1958) as prosecutor Herbert von Treskow
  (1958) as Dr. Hans Römer
 Mrs. Warren's Profession (1960) as Sir George Crofts
 The Nabob Affair (1960) as Le Nabab
 The Marriage of Mr. Mississippi (1961) as Florestan Mississippi
 Life Begins at Eight (1962) as Mac Thomas
 The Elusive Corporal (1962) as drunk passenger on the train
 Lulu (1962) as Dr. Schön
 Vice and Virtue (1963) as General von Bamberg
 The Secret of Dr. Mabuse (1964) as Prof. Larsen
 Three Rooms in Manhattan (1965) as Hourvitch
 State of Siege (1972) as Carlos Ducas
 The Peaceful Age (1975) as Simone
 Ice Age (1975) as Old Man
 Konkurs (TV-series The Old Fox) (1977) as consul Karst

Awards 
 1951: Berliner Kunstpreis
 1955: Berliner Senatspreis
 1961: member of Berlin Akademy of Arts
 1964: Staatsschauspieler
 1973: Ernst-Reuter-Plakette
 1973: Großes Verdienstkreuz der Bundesrepublik Deutschland

References

External links 
 O.E. Hasse at Internet Movie Database
 picture and CV of Hasse (German)
 picture of Hasse

1903 births
1978 deaths
People from Szamotuły County
German male stage actors
German male television actors
German male film actors
German theatre directors
German gay actors
LGBT theatre directors
Commanders Crosses of the Order of Merit of the Federal Republic of Germany
People from the Province of Posen
Ernst Busch Academy of Dramatic Arts alumni
Luftwaffe personnel of World War II
20th-century German male actors
20th-century German LGBT people